Erindale GO Station is a GO Transit railway station on the Milton line in the Greater Toronto Area, Ontario, Canada. It is located at 1320 Rathburn Road West, just east of the Credit River in the Creditview neighbourhood of Mississauga, west of the Square One area.

Like many other GO stations, Erindale offers parking facilities, and has a station building which houses ticket sales and includes a waiting room.

Erindale acted as a terminus for the midday trains that GO Transit once operated on the Milton Line during the early to mid-1990s, but these trains no longer run.

Although ridership on the Milton line has grown beyond GO's expectations, it is not possible to run more trains, because the tracks are already busy with Canadian Pacific Railway freight traffic. In order to increase capacity, GO has extended the platforms to accommodate trains with twelve carriages rather than the previous ten.

Erindale was most recently upgraded and is now fully wheel chair accessible.

A construction project underwent a new multi-level covered parking structure with 1700 new spaces, new bus loop, dedicated pedestrian pathways, and covered pedestrian bridge to the station tracks. The project was completed in the spring of 2014.

Connecting buses
MiWay 
20 Rathburn via City Centre Transit Terminal to Kipling Subway Station. 
6 Credit Woodlands (on Burnhamthorpe Road)
9 Rathburn-Thomas (on Rathburn Road)
26 Burnhamthorpe (on Burnhamthorpe Road)
37 Creditview-Erindale GO
38/38A Creditview (on Creditview Road)
 
GO Transit
 21 Milton/Toronto

Credit Valley Railway station

When the Credit Valley Railway opened in 1879, it built a station on Erindale Station Road, about a kilometre east of the current GO Transit facility. (The Credit Valley Railway was absorbed by the Canadian Pacific Railway in 1884.) With the decline of passenger traffic on the line, the old Erindale station was demolished in the 1950s.

References

External links

GO Transit railway stations
Galt Subdivision
Railway stations in Mississauga
Railway stations in Canada opened in 1981
1981 establishments in Ontario